Elda is a city in the province of Alicante, Spain.

Elda may also refer to:

People
Elda Cerrato (born 1930), Argentine artist
Elda Cividino (1921–2014), Italian gymnast
Elda Dessel (1925–2010), Argentine actress
Elda Emma Anderson (1899–1961), American physicist and health researcher
Elda Ferri, Italian film producer
Elda Furry (1885–1966), American gossip columnist and actress
Elda Gómez Lugo (born 1941), Mexican politician
Elda Grin (1928–2016), Armenian writer, psychologist, professor, and legal expert
Elda Neyis Mosquera (born 1963), Colombian commander
Elda Panopoulou (born 1960s), Greek comedian
Elda Peralta (born 1932), Mexican film actress
Elda Pértile (born 1953), Argentine politician
Elda Pucci (1928—2005), Italian politician and professor
Elda Tattoli (1929–2005), Italian actress and film director
Elda Vokel (1911–2001), American stage and motion picture actress

Groups
Evaluations and Language Resources Distribution Agency (ELDA), an operational body of the European Language Resources Association (ELRA)
European Lighting Designers' Association (ELDA+), an international association of architectural lighting designers
CBF Elda, a Spanish women's handball team

Other uses
Chi (Chobits), also known as Elda, a fictional character in the manga and anime series Chobits
MV Elda, a Greek refrigerated coaster in service from 1967 to 1970